The 2016 Nuneaton and Bedworth Borough Council election was held on 5 May 2016 as part of the 2016 United Kingdom local elections and alongside the 2016 Warwickshire Police and Crime Commissioner election. As part of the staggered four-year election cycle, half of the borough council was up for re-election in addition to a vacant seat in the Exhall ward. Overall this meant that eighteen council seats were contested.

Prior to the election, Nuneaton and Bedworth was seen to be a "swing council" that was expected to see a drop in support for the Labour Party due to the perceived unpopularity of party leader Jeremy Corbyn. Despite losing some seats and seeing a reduced share of the popular vote, Labour retained their majority on the council. Among the seats up for election, they won twelve. The Conservative Party won five and the Green Party won one.

Results 

Total voting figures reflect that voters in the Exhall ward were entitled to cast two ballots. Change is compared to the 2012 Nuneaton and Bedworth Borough Council election but includes the vacant Exhall seat last elected in the 2014 election.

|}

Council composition 

Despite losing, the Labour Party retained their major and control of the council.

Ward results 

Turnout figures exclude invalid ballots. Swing is calculated between the winning candidate and the candidate finishing second.

Abbey

Arbury

Attleborough

Barpool

Bede

Bulkington

Camp Hill

Exhall 

Exhall elected two councillors at this election. Doughty was elected to a four-year term and Pomfrett was elected to a two-year term. The percentage figures given reflect that voters could cast two ballots (i.e. they are not a percentage of every vote cast) and will add up to 200% as a result. Due to the nature of the election, swing calculations are not possible.

Galley Common

Heath

Kingswood

Poplar

Slough

St. Nicolas

Weddington

Wem Brook

Whitestone

References

2016 English local elections
2016
2010s in Warwickshire